Manchev (masculine) or Mancheva (feminine) is a Bulgarian surname. Notable people with the surname include:

Dimitar Manchev (1934–2009), Bulgarian actor
Georgi Manchev (born 1990), Bulgarian volleyball player
Lachezar Manchev (born 1989), Bulgarian footballer
Milen Manchev (born 2001), Bulgarian footballer
Nikolay Manchev (born 1985), Bulgarian footballer
Vladimir Manchev (born 1977), Bulgarian footballer

Bulgarian-language surnames